A kuguacin is one of several chemical compounds isolated from the bitter melon vine (Momordica charantia, kǔguā in Chinese) by J.-C. Chen and others.

Kuguacins are cucurbitacins, formally derived from the triterpene hydrocarbon cucurbitane. They include:

 Kuguacin A
 Kuguacin B
 Kuguacin C
 Kuguacin D
 Kuguacin E
 Kuguacin F: ; 47 mg/kg, needles, melts at 275–276 °C 
 Kuguacin G: ; 23 mg/kg, needles, melts at 250–252 °C 
 Kuguacin H: ; 27 mg/kg, needles, melts at 226–228 °C 
 Kuguacin I: ; 20 mg/kg, needles, melts at 235–237 °C 
 Kuguacin J: ; 243 mg/kg, powder, melts at 166–169 °C 
 Kuguacin K: ; 130 mg/kg, powder, melts at 275–277 °C 
 Kuguacin L: ; 30 mg/kg, needles, melts at 320–321 °C 
 Kuguacin M: ; 7 mg/kg, needles, melts at 332–333 °C 
 Kuguacin N: ; 247 mg/kg, powder, melts at 140–143 °C 
 Kuguacin O: ; 20 mg/kg, needles, melts at 267–269 °C 
 Kuguacin P: ; 293 mg/kg, prisms, melts at 229–231 °C 
 Kuguacin Q: ; 11 mg/kg, needles, melts at 219–221 °C 
 Kuguacin R: ; 1357 mg/kg 
 Kuguacin S: ; 17 mg/kg, powder, melts at 174–177 °C 

Kuguacins F-S can be extracted with ethanol from the stems and leaves of M. charantia. Kuguacins I, J, and Q are artifacts of the extraction process. Kuguacin R is obtained as mixture of two epimers. In this process one also obtains momordicine I, kuguacin E, 5β,19-epoxycucurbita-6,23-diene-3β,19,25-triol, karavilagenin D, 3β,7β,25-trihydroxycucurbita-5,(23E)-dien-19-al, and 3β,7β-dihydroxy-25-methoxycucurbita-5,(23E)-dien-19-al In vitro tests showed weak anti-HIV activity for kuguacins F-S, especially kuguacin Q and kuguacin S.

References 

Steroids